Francisco Méndez (1907-1962) was a Guatemalan poet and short-story writer born in Joyabaj, El Quiché. He published his first poem at the age of eighteen, and moved to the city of Quetzaltenango shortly after. A self-taught writer, he went on to publish numerous volumes of poetry, including the celebrated Nocturnos. He wrote for the Guatemala City newspaper El Imparcial from 1935 until his death, and he is linked to a generation of Guatemalan writers from the 1930s known as the Tepeus. His book of memoirs and short stories, Stories of Joyabaj, was published posthumously .

Sources 
 Words Without Borders 
 Pagina de Literatura Guatemalteca  
 Ministerio de Cultura, Guatemala 
 The Archive of Hispanic Literature on Tape: A Descriptive Guide, by Francisco Aguilera, Library of Congress Latin American, Portuguese, and Spanish Division. Washington: Library of Congress, 1974.

External links 
 The Water Cathedral
Francisco Mendez recorded at the Library of Congress for the Hispanic Division’s audio literary archive between 1955 and 1961

20th-century Guatemalan poets
20th-century male writers
Guatemalan male poets
Guatemalan male short story writers
Guatemalan short story writers
20th-century memoirists
Magic realism writers
1907 births
1962 deaths
People from Quiché Department
20th-century Guatemalan people
20th-century short story writers